Linying County is a county of central Henan province, China. It is under the administration of Luohe city.

Administrative divisions
As 2012, this county is divided to 9 towns and 6 townships.
Towns

Townships

Climate

See also
Nanjie, a village in Linying County

References

 
County-level divisions of Henan
Luohe